César Flores Maldonado (born 28 February 1963) is a Mexican economist and  politician affiliated with the Institutional Revolutionary Party (formerly to the Party of the Democratic Revolution). As of 2014 he served as Deputy of the LX Legislature of the Mexican Congress representing Guerrero.

References

1963 births
Living people
Politicians from Guerrero
Mexican economists
Institutional Revolutionary Party politicians
Party of the Democratic Revolution politicians
National Autonomous University of Mexico alumni
21st-century Mexican politicians
Members of the Chamber of Deputies (Mexico) for Guerrero